Sir Edward Bacon (died 8 September 1618), of Shrubland Hall in the parish of Coddenham in Suffolk, England, was a Member of Parliament and an elder  half-brother of the philosopher and statesman Sir Francis Bacon.

Life
He was the third son of Sir Nicholas Bacon, Lord Keeper of the Great Seal to Queen Elizabeth I, by his first wife Jane Fernley, a daughter of  William Ferneley of Creeting St Peter in Suffolk. Like his two elder brothers he was educated at Trinity College, Cambridge and entered Gray's Inn for legal training. He became a Member of Parliament, representing Great Yarmouth (1576–1581) in Suffolk,  Tavistock (1584) in Devon, Weymouth and Melcombe Regis (1586) and the County Seat of Suffolk (1593). He also served as High Sheriff of Suffolk in 1601, and was knighted in 1603.

During the late 1570s Bacon travelled in continental Europe (Paris, Ravenna, Padua, Vienna).  He stayed a longer period of time in Geneva, where he visited two leading Protestants Johannes Sturmius and Lambert Danaeus; Bacon lived in Theodore Beza’s house in Geneva while a student of the latter. Bacon had returned to England by 1583.

Marriage and issue
In about 1581 he married Helen Little, daughter and heiress of Thomas Little of Shrubland Hall by his wife Elizabeth Lytton, a daughter and co-heiress of Sir Robert Lytton of Knebworth House in Hertfordshire. By his wife he had two sons who were also Members of Parliament:
Nathaniel Bacon (1593–1660);
Francis Bacon (1600–1663).

Notes

References
 , subentry at end
 J. E. Neale, The Elizabethan House of Commons (London: Jonathan Cape, 1949)

External links

1618 deaths
16th-century births
English MPs 1572–1583
Members of Gray's Inn
High Sheriffs of Suffolk
Alumni of Trinity College, Cambridge
English MPs 1584–1585
English MPs 1586–1587
English MPs 1593
Edward
People from Barham, Suffolk
Members of the Parliament of England for Tavistock